Sharon Campbell is a British diplomat who was the British Ambassador to Haiti until August 2020. From 2011 to 2015 she was the British Ambassador to Costa Rica.

She and her husband, Chris Campbell, were the first married couple ever to be ambassadors to neighbouring countries.

References

External links 
 UK Government webpage

Living people
British women ambassadors
21st-century British diplomats
Ambassadors of the United Kingdom to Haiti
Ambassadors of the United Kingdom to Costa Rica
Year of birth missing (living people)